"This Love" is a song by American country pop music artist LeAnn Rimes from her Greatest Hits compilation album (2003), released as the album's solo single. The song was co-written by Rimes along with Marc Beeson and Jim Collins and produced by Dann Huff. It is partly orchestrated, featuring a string arrangement consisting of violins, violas, and celli arranged and conducted by Canadian-American arranger David Campbell. The song was serviced to American country radio on November 17, 2003, and was issued as a CD single on February 2, 2004, in the United Kingdom.

"This Love" peaked at number 37 on the US Billboard Country Songs chart. Internationally, it reached number 54 on the UK Singles Chart, number 49 on the Romanian Singles Chart, and number 26 on the Irish Singles Chart. A live performance was used as the music video for the song. "This Love" was later included on her international Best of album (2004).

Track listing
UK CD single
 "This Love" – 3:54
 "The Right Kind of Wrong" – 3:47
 "Please Remember" – 4:34

Credits and personnel
Credits are adapted from the UK CD single and Greatest Hits liner notes.

Studios
 Recorded at Ocean Way Nashville (Nashville, Tennessee)
 Strings recorded at Record One (Los Angeles, California)
 Mixed at Emerald Entertainment (Nashville, Tennessee)
 Mastered at Gateway Mastering (Portland, Maine, US)

Personnel

 LeAnn Rimes – writing, vocals
 Marc Beeson – writing
 Jim Collins – writing
 Lisa Cochran – backing vocals
 Perry Coleman – backing vocals
 B. James Lowry – acoustic guitar
 Dann Huff – electric guitar, production
 Jerry McPherson – electric guitar
 Tom Bukovac – electric guitar
 Dan Dugmore – steel guitar
 Glenn Worf – bass
 Steve Nathan – keyboards

 Tim Akers – keyboards
 Shannon Forrest – drums
 Eric Darken – percussion
 Jeff Balding – recording, mixing
 Mark Hagen – recording
 David Bryant – recording assistant
 Jed Hackett – mixing assistant
 John Saylor – mixing assistant
 Dino Herrmann – Pro Tools engineering
 Christopher Rowe – digital editing
 Adam Ayan – mastering

Orchestra

 Berj Garabedian – violin
 Joel Derouin – violin
 Josefina Vergara – violin
 Margaret Wooten – violin
 Michele Richards – violin
 Peter Kent – violin
 Evan Wilson – viola
 Bob Becker – viola
 Larry Corbett – cello
 Suzie Katayama – cello
 David Campbell – string arrangement, conducting
 Steve Churchyard – recording

Charts

Release history

References

2003 singles
2003 songs
Curb Records singles
LeAnn Rimes songs
London Records singles
Songs written by Jim Collins (singer)
Songs written by LeAnn Rimes
Songs written by Marc Beeson